Pinasca is a comune (municipality) in the Metropolitan City of Turin in the Italian region Piedmont, located about  southwest of Turin in the Val Chisone.

Pinasca borders the following municipalities: Giaveno, Perosa Argentina, Cumiana, Pinerolo, Frossasco, San Pietro Val Lemina, Inverso Pinasca, and Villar Perosa.

Twin towns
 Wiernsheim, Germany (1982)

References

External links
Official website

Cities and towns in Piedmont